"The Paranoid Style in American Politics" is an essay by American historian Richard J. Hofstadter, first published in Harper's Magazine in November 1964. It was the title essay in a book by the author the following year. Published soon after Senator Barry Goldwater won the Republican presidential nomination over the more moderate Nelson A. Rockefeller, Hofstadter's article explores the influence of a particular style of conspiracy theory and "movements of suspicious discontent" throughout American history.

Background
Richard Hofstadter's 1959 BBC radio lecture on "The American Right Wing and the Paranoid Style" was later revised and published as "The Paranoid Style in American Politics" in the November 1964 Harper's Magazine. 

Historian Andrew McKenzie has described changes and continuities in Hofstadter's "semantic currents" that culminated in the 1959 lecture. Hofstadter's initial focus on "status anxiety" tied to "interest politics" came from Franz Neumann's "Anxiety and Politics" (1954). Frankfurt School adherent Herbert Marcuse similarly connected "status anxiety" to "interest politics" in a eulogy for the deceased Neumann during a memorial service at Columbia University in 1955. Hofstadter shifted to studying the concepts of "paranoia" as well as "paranoid" in "pseudo-conservatism," partly based on The Authoritarian Personality (1950) by another Frankfurt School member, Theodor W. Adorno---in 1967, Hofstadter admitted that the book was an “influ.[ential] study for me"---and additional 1950 publications by Adorno. Hofstadter's 1954 paper on "paranoia" in "pseudo-conservatism" was presented at the 1954 Seminar of the State, convened by post-industrial sociologist, 1950s Cold War liberal, and post-1965 neoconservative Daniel Bell. The provenance of the phrase "paranoid style," according to McKenzie's current research, can surprisingly be traced to the archived correspondence of then-BBC producer George MacBeth, in a late January 1959 transmissive proposing the same to Hofstadter. The historian had taken up temporary residence at the University of Cambridge, overseen by Jack Pole, before Pole transferred to the University of Oxford. On August 2, 1959, Hofstadter delivered his radio lecture on "The American Right Wing and the Paranoid Style." Hofstadter hoped to "find a quality shared by both McCarthyism and the patchwork of grassroots organizations that, in the aftermath of McCarthy’s downfall, sustained the pseudo-conservative cause on a local level." 

Hofstadter subsequently identified the "post-McCarthy Right" with "pseudo-conservatism," jettisoning "status anxiety" and "status politics" in favor of "the paranoid style" and "projective politics." The notion of projective behavior in politics was influenced by the psychoanalysis of Sigmund Freud and the sociology of Karl Mannheim. In that context, " 'style' possessed precisely the requisite elasticity that allowed it to bridge the divide between the poles of the individual and the social (or, expressed somewhat differently, between the disciplines of psychology and sociology)...the concept of style functions differently because it has the capacity to mediate between both the individual [premised on Weberian ideal types] and supra-individual levels...Hofstadter’s conceptual innovation had the advantage of allowing him to describe the style in which McCarthy had played 'the political game' as paranoid, while reserving judgment on his personal mental state." The idea of the "paranoid style" transcended contexts, consequently leaving Hofstadter open to charges of devising both an "ahistorical" conceptual history and, counterintuitively, a history that emphasized change through linear time. As late as 1964, Hofstadter still self-identified as a Cold War liberal. He aimed his November essay in  Harper's Magazine at the Barry Goldwater 1964 presidential campaign's, and possibly John Birch Society's, infusion of the "post-McCarthy Right"'s "paranoid style" into mid-twentieth-century Republican partisan understandings of libertarianism in the United States. Changes and continuities in such understandings within second-wave New Right circles and post-1996 neoconservatism fell outside the scope of McKenzie's analysis. 

Hofstadter adapted the essay from a Herbert Spencer Lecture he delivered at Oxford University on November 21, 1963. An abridged version was first published in the November 1964 issue of Harper's Magazine, and was published as the titular essay in the book The Paranoid Style in American Politics, and Other Essays (1965).

Historical themes

In developing the subject, Hofstadter initially establishes that his use of the phrase "paranoid style" was a borrowing from the clinical psychiatric term paranoid to describe a political personality, and acknowledges that the term is pejorative.

Historical applications
Historians have also applied the paranoid category to other political movements, such as the conservative Constitutional Union Party of 1860.  Hofstadter's approach was later applied to the rise of new right-wing groups, including the Christian Right and the Patriot Movement.

The political scientist Michael Paul Rogin, in his book The Intellectuals and McCarthy: The Radical Specter (1967), offered a thorough criticism of Hofstadter's thesis regarding the People's, or Populist, party of the 1890s and similar progressive groups, showing that the ethnic and religious groups that supported Joseph McCarthy and other "paranoid style" figures differ from those who supported the Populists and their successors, and thus that the origins of McCarthyism cannot be found within agrarian radical groups. Despite Rogin's work, the tendency to conflate left-wing and right-wing populism, ignoring significant differences between the two, remains a significant long-term effect of Hofstadter's work.

Another aspect of Hofstadter's thesis has been challenged by Samuel DeCanio's 2013 article "Populism, Paranoia, and the Politics of Free Silver," which argues that instead of being a paranoid delusion, the Populists' position regarding bankers' use of bribes to influence 19th century monetary policy was largely correct.  DeCanio offers evidence that the Coinage Act of 1873, legislation that eliminated bimetallism and which the Populists' denounced as the "Crime of 73," was influenced by bribes that William Ralston, president of The Bank of California, paid to Henry Linderman, director of the Philadelphia Mint. DeCanio's article includes a copy of the actual check Ralston used to pay Linderman, indicating the Populists' claims were far more accurate than Hofstadter ever suspected.

A 2020 study detailed the ways in which President Donald Trump used the paranoid style (described by Hofstadter) substantially more than his post-World War II predecessors.

Legacy
In a 2007 article in Harper's, Scott Horton wrote that "The Paranoid Style in American Politics" was "one of the most important and most influential articles published in the 155–year history of the magazine." Thomas Frank, in a 2014 essay for Harper's, was more critical, suggesting that Hofstadter's method had popularized a "pseudopsychological approach to politics." 

Journalists continue to draw on the essay to analyze 21st-century public affairs. Laura Miller wrote in Salon.com in 2011 that  "'The Paranoid Style in American Politics' reads like a playbook for the career of Glenn Beck, right down to the paranoid's 'quality of pedantry' and 'heroic strivings for 'evidence'..." Economist Paul Krugman titled a 2018 op-ed in The New York Times "The Paranoid Style in G.O.P. Politics" and explicitly referred to the 1964 essay. Researcher Travis View, writing in The Washington Post in 2019, described the QAnon conspiracy as an example of "the paranoid style as described by Hofstadter."

Critics have argued that Hofstadter erred in confining conspiracy theories to the political fringe. Eve Kosofsky Sedgwick has observed that Hofstadter's essay assumes "a presumptive 'we'—apparently still practically everyone," who regard conspiracy theories "from a calm, understanding, and encompassing middle ground." Sedgwick, and later Gordon Fraser, argued that conspiracy theories after the middle of the twentieth century proliferated to such a degree that Hofstadter's imagined, rationally liberal audience no longer exists, if it ever existed in the first place.

See also
 Among the Truthers
 Conspiracy: How the Paranoid Style Flourishes and Where It Comes From

References

External links
 Full text of "The Paranoid Style in American Politics." Harper's Magazine (Nov. 1964).

Political science books
Political history of the United States
Books about the far right
Books about politics of the United States
Harper's Magazine articles
Conspiracy theories in the United States
Patriot movement
1964 essays